Crézancy is a commune in the Aisne department in Hauts-de-France in northern France.

Crézancy is located on ex-national road 3, which links Paris to Strasbourg. It is home of a Lycée specialized in Viticulture.

Population

Sights
The church was built in the 13th century and features a Roman portal.

See also
Communes of the Aisne department

References

Communes of Aisne
Aisne communes articles needing translation from French Wikipedia